Redzikowo  (German: Reitz, Kashubian: Redzëkòwò) is a village in northern Poland, located in Gmina Słupsk, Słupsk County, Pomeranian Voivodeship, 5 km to the east of Słupsk. It has 405 inhabitants (2006).

Just to the north of it is the Słupsk-Redzikowo Airport which was to be the site of a US missile defense complex that was planned to be built by 2012. The original project was cancelled in September 2009, but the airfield was expected to be a base for SM-3 Block IIA missiles of the Aegis Ashore component of the Aegis Ballistic Missile Defense System starting in 2018. As the work was delayed, in 2020 the base is expected to be operational in 2022.

History
The village is first mentioned in historical records from 1288, when it was part of fragmented Kingdom of Poland, and duke Mestwin II granted the village to a monastery of Norbertine nuns. In subsequent centuries Reitz had been a fief owned in succession by various noble families. In the 18th century the village became part of the Kingdom of Prussia, and in 1871 it became part of the German Empire. In 1814 the manor was sold to the Arnold family. In 1938 the owner of the estate had been Friedrich Wilhelm Arnold.

In 1935 the construction of an airfield named Stolp-Reitz started next to the village (earlier airfield named Stolp-West located in the area was built during World War I).  Later the airfield became an Air Weapons School for the Luftwaffe, and a number of hangars and other buildings were added. On March 8, 1945, the region was occupied by the Red Army  and the German inhabitants were expelled. From the end of World War II to 1950 the base was used by the Soviet Air Force. Although after the end of the war the region became part of People's Republic of Poland, Redzikowo and its airfield remained under Russian control until 1950.  It was handed over to the Polish Air Force in 1950. The base was subsequently used by the 28 Słupski Pułk Lotnictwa Myśliwskiego (28th Słupsk Fighter Aviation Regiment, disbanded in 1999).  It also functioned for a time as a civil airport. At present the airfield is only used by small civil airplanes.

Aegis Ashore
The governments of the United States and Poland approved the building and operation of an Aegis Ashore AN/SPY-1 system adjacent to the town. Delays added around four years to the construction process stretching the start of operations into 2022. Another system is at Deveselu, Romania, and has been operational since 2016. They are part of the European Phased Adaptive Approach to regional missile defence against threats from Iran and includes Aegis radar-capable ships based at Rota, Spain, and AN/TPY-2 radar in Turkey (operational since 2011).

References

External links
  Demonstration in Redzikowo, March 29, 2008]

Villages in Słupsk County
Polish Air Force bases
Soviet Air Force bases
Poland–Soviet Union relations